is a Japanese footballer who plays as a midfielder for Nagoya Grampus.

Career
Nagasawa made his debut for Yokohama F. Marinos on 3 April 2013 in the J. League Cup against Omiya Ardija in which he came on in the 76th minute as Yokohama lost the match 1–0.

1. FC Köln
On 23 December 2013 it was confirmed that Nagasawa had signed for German side 1. FC Köln after a trial period. He made his debut for Köln in the league on 9 February 2014 against SC Paderborn. He came on in the 68th minute for Mišo Brečko as Koln lost 0–1.

Career statistics

Club

1Includes Japanese Super Cup, Suruga Bank Championship and FIFA Club World Cup.

International
Source:

Honours

Club
1. FC Köln
2. Bundesliga: 2013–14

Urawa Red Diamonds
AFC Champions League: 2017
Emperor's Cup: 2018

Nagoya Grampus
J.League Cup: 2021

References

External links

Profile at JEF United Chiba
Profile at Urawa Red Diamonds

1991 births
Living people
Senshu University alumni
Association football people from Chiba Prefecture
Japanese footballers
J1 League players
J2 League players
2. Bundesliga players
Yokohama F. Marinos players
1. FC Köln players
JEF United Chiba players
Urawa Red Diamonds players
Japanese expatriate footballers
Japanese expatriate sportspeople in Germany
Expatriate footballers in Germany
Association football midfielders
Japan international footballers
Universiade bronze medalists for Japan
Universiade medalists in football
Medalists at the 2013 Summer Universiade
Bundesliga players
Nagoya Grampus players